The Patras Science Park is a science park located in Patras, Greece near the University of Patras and the University Hospital of Rio. The site is the home for many high technology companies in Western Greece.

Companies
The following companies and institutes are current or former residents of the Science Park:
Atmel, A San Jose, California-based Semiconductor company
Analogies SA, a high speed wired and wireless connectivity Semiconductor intellectual property core company 
ByteMobile, acquired by Citrix Systems 
Nanoradio, a Swedish fabless wireless connectivity semiconductor company, acquired by Samsung
Think Silicon, an embedded GPU company
Velti, a mobile marketing and advertising company

References

External links
Patras Science Park

Science parks in Greece
Patras